Quarantine Act may refer to:
 Quarantine Act 1710, an act of the Parliament of Great Britain
 Quarantine Act 1721, an act of the Parliament of Great Britain
 Quarantine Act 1908, an act of the Parliament of Australia
 Quarantine Act, 2005, an act of the Parliament of Canada